Michael MacKay Austin (born August 26, 1943) is a retired American swimmer. He represented the United States at the 1964 Summer Olympics in Tokyo, Japan, and won a gold medal in the 4 × 100 m freestyle relay with teammates Steve Clark, Gary Ilman and Don Schollander, setting a new world record of 3:33.2.  Individually, he placed sixth in the 100 m freestyle with a time of 54.5 seconds.

Austin attended Yale University, where he swam for coach Phil Moriarty's Yale Bulldogs swimming and diving team in National Collegiate Athletic Association (NCAA) and Ivy League competition from 1962 to 1964.  He graduated from Yale with his bachelor's degree in 1964.  Austin donated his Olympic gold medal to his alma mater in 2006.

See also
 List of Olympic medalists in swimming (men)
 List of Yale University people
 World record progression 4 × 100 metres freestyle relay

References

External links 

 
 

1943 births
Living people
American male freestyle swimmers
World record setters in swimming
Olympic gold medalists for the United States in swimming
People from West Orange, New Jersey
Swimmers at the 1964 Summer Olympics
Yale Bulldogs men's swimmers
Medalists at the 1964 Summer Olympics
20th-century American people